Mostly Sunny or Mostly sunny may refer to:

 Mostly Sunny, a 2016 film directed by Dilip Mehta
 Mostly sunny, term used to describe cloud coverage
 Mostly Sunny, the former title of Ball Park Music's self-titled album